Al-Imtiaz Academy is a school in Abbottabad, Pakistan. It consists of three branches,  
a girls' high school and college, a boys' high school and an elementary school.

The academy was founded by Imtiaz Nawaz (a grandmother-in-law of Canadian singer Dawud Wharnsby) in 1986, and now has about 1000 students.

References

External links
 The Schoolhouse Project

Schools in Abbottabad